Pemmasani Ramalinga Nayudu is named as a commander and 'chief general' of the Vijayanagara emperor Krishnadevaraya in the 17th century Telugu text Rayavachakamu, and a later poetic rendition Krishnarajavijayam. 
 
He was an army commander of a Vijayanagara military unit comprising nearly 80,000 soldiers. An inscription dated to 1544 AD, which was found in Tallaproddatu, states that Pemmasani Ramalinga enjoyed the nayankara (feudal control) of the village.

According to Rayavachakamu, he was a commander for the Vijayanagar king Krishnadevaraya at a certain 'Battle with the Turks'. Historian Venkataramanayya identified the battle as the one fought at Devni or Dewani (unidentified) in 1509–1510, within a year of Krishnadevaraya's accession. But some elements of the narrative are also reminiscent of the Battle of Raichur.
Ramalinga is said to have played a crucial role in winning the battle against combined armies of Kalburgie, Golconda and Ahmednagar for Krishnadevaraya. Krishnadevaraya honoured him with gold threaded clothes and jewels following this victory.

He is the son of Pemmasani Timmanayudu II and Machamma.
The Pemmasani Nayaks were a martial clan. During the Aravidu Dynasty of the Vijayanagara Empire, the Pemmasanis were in prominence as the chieftains of Gandikota sima and ministers at the Vijayanagara court.
Burton Stein relays that the Pemmasanis controlled numerous small villages and many large towns and had large mercenary armies that were the vanguard of the Vijayanagara Empire in the sixteenth century. 

Ramalinga and his brother, Erra Timmanayudu, fought and won various battles for Aliya Rama Raya, including the Battle of Juturu, Battle of Betamcherla, Battle of Bedakallu, and Battle of Adoni. It was mainly with their cooperation that Rama Raya won the succession conflict following the death of Achyuta Devaraya against Salakaraju Tirumala.

See also  
Pemmasani Nayaks
Pemmasani Timma Nayaka
Battle of Raichur

Notes

Bibliography 
 
 
 
 

Telugu people
History of Karnataka
Year of birth unknown
Year of death unknown
Vijayanagara Empire
History of Andhra Pradesh